Lichenoverruculina is a fungal genus in the family Hyponectriaceae and order Amphisphaeriales. This is a monotypic genus, containing the single species Lichenoverruculina sigmatospora. which was published in Herzogia vol.24 (2) on page 274 in 2011. 

In a revision of lichenicolous fungi described by Spegazzini by botanists Etayo & Rosato in 2008, they proposed a new genus of Verruculina , unfortunately they were unaware that this generic name was already used for an unrelated marine fungus group by Kohlmeyer & Volkmann-Kohlmeyer (in 1990), as Verruculina .
The name Lichenoverruculina , was then proposed to replace Verruculina .

DescriptionLichenoverruculina is lichenicolous (a parasitic fungus that only lives on lichen as the host), with immersed perithecia under the thallus of various Heterodermia species (a genera of lichen in the family Physciaceae''). 
The genus has abundant paraphyses (erect sterile filament-like support structures), 32-spored, cylindrical asci and fusoid-sigmoid, 2-celled, hyaline ascospores.

Distribution
It has only been found in Brazil, South America.

References

Monotypic Sordariomycetes genera
Lichenicolous fungi